Chandica quadripennis is a moth of the family Nolidae first described by Frederic Moore in 1888. It is found in the Himalayas, Peninsular Malaysia, Sumatra and Borneo.

References

External links
Malaysian Encyclopedia of Life

Chloephorinae